Narcís or Narcis may refer to:

 M923 Narcis, a Belgian Tripartite-class minehunter
 NARCIS (Netherlands), National Academic Research and Collaboration Information System

People with the given name
Narcis Bosch, Spanish pornographic film director
Narcís Casal de Fonsdeviela, the Ambassador of Andorra to the United States
Narcís de Carreras (1905–1991), Spanish lawyer and president of FC Barcelona
Narcis Iustin Ianău (born 1995), Romanian countertenor
Narcís Jubany Arnau (1913–1996), Spanish Cardinal of the Roman Catholic Church
Narcís Martí Filosia (born 1945), Spanish footballer
Narcís Monturiol (1819–1885), Spanish Catalan engineer, artist and intellectual
Narcís Oller (1846–1930), Spanish Catalan author
Narcis Răducan (born 1974), former Romanian football player, currently sports director
Narcís Serra (born 1943), Mayor of Barcelona from 1979 to 1982

See also
Narciso (disambiguation)

Romanian masculine given names